Andreea Arsine (born 14 September 1988) is a Romanian race walker. She competed in the women's 20 kilometres walk event at the 2016 Summer Olympics. In 2018, she competed in the women's 20 kilometres walk event at the 2018 European Athletics Championships held in Berlin, Germany. She finished in 26th place.

References

External links
 

1988 births
Living people
Sportspeople from Botoșani
Romanian female racewalkers
Athletes (track and field) at the 2016 Summer Olympics
Olympic athletes of Romania
21st-century Romanian women